Red Bull Crashed Ice was a world tour in ice cross downhill, a winter extreme sporting event which involves downhill skating in an urban environment, on a track which includes steep turns and high vertical drops. Racers speed down the course's turns, berms, and jumps. Competitors, having advanced from one of the tryouts in the prior months, race in heats of four skaters, with the top two advancing from each heat. The events were held from 2001 to 2019; the ATSX now oversees ice cross downhill events.

The series was created and is managed by energy drinks company Red Bull. It is similar to ski cross and snowboard cross, except with ice skates on an ice track, instead of skis or snowboards on a snow track.

As a bandy player, Felder represented the United States national bandy team, while in ice cross downhill, represented Sweden while equipped with ice hockey gear. Felder was first in the single-event in 2001, 2002, 2003, 2005, 2009, and twice in 2004.

Single event winners

World championship era
From 2010 onwards a points system was introduced. After the season, the skater with the most points is crowned the world champion. Points are awarded to the top 100 racers. Points are awarded starting with 1000 for the winner, after that 800, 600, 500 and decreasing to 0.5 for place 100.

For the 2015 season, the Riders Cup events were instituted. The events were designed to make the sport more accessible to more skaters. For these events, skaters can earn up to 25% of the points that the main events are awarded, with percentages decreasing with each placing. Meaning that the winner receives 250 points, which is 25% of the main event 1000 points and it decreases to 1% of the main event points for the 64th finisher, who receives 2.5 points. Any placings 65th and beyond do not score any points.

As well, a new wrinkle was added to the overall championship called the "throw out" rule. If a competitor competes in all of the stops, up to a maximum of 12 events in future years, the lowest main event score and the lowest Riders Cup score will be thrown out. This will give the skater an adjusted score for the overall championship. Thus, meaning that it is in the skater's best interest to compete in all events.

Individual Competition

2016 World Championship

2017 World Championship

2018 World Championship

2019 World Championship

Men's competition

2010 World Championship

2011 World Championship

2012 World Championship

2013 World Championship

2014 World Championship

2015 World Championship

Team Competition

2013 Team Challenge World Championship

2014 Team Challenge World Championship

2015 Team Challenge World Championship

Women's competition

2015 Women's World Championship

Gallery

References 

 Red Bull’s Headlong Frozen Dash Is a Crash Course in Marketing, By Matt Higgins, New York Times, March 3, 2007
 Red Bull Crashed Ice returns to Quebec City, by Melissa Halarides, The Concordian, March 7, 2007
 A Downhill Ice Course, Full Hockey Gear and the Need for Speed, Market Wire, August 2006 
 Crashed Ice: Le parcours de l'an dernier gonflé aux stéroïdes, by Ian Bussières, Le Soleil, January 25th 2008, P. 8 & 9

External links 

 Official site

Red Bull sports events
Ice skating
Recurring sporting events established in 2001